Cedex or CEDEX may refer to:

Centro de Estudios y Experimentación de Obras Públicas, a civil engineering research agency in Spain
Courrier d'Entreprise à Distribution EXceptionnelle, a system designed for recipients of large volumes of mail in France
Container Equipment Data Exchange, also known as ISO 9897
The Centre for Decision Research and Experimental Economics at the University of Nottingham